Two Headed Freap is the debut album by American organist Ronnie Foster recorded in 1972 and released on the Blue Note label.

Reception
The AllMusic review by Stephen Thomas Erlewine awarded the album 4½ stars and stated "Everything on Two Headed Freap is about glitzy groove -- it sounds cinematic, colorful, and funky. It's true that there is little real improvisation here and the songs all have a similar groove, but it's worked well, and the music is ultimately appealing to fans of this genre. Jazz purists -- even soul-jazz purists -- will likely find this music a little monotonous and commercial, but fans of early-'70s funk from Sly Stone to Herbie Hancock will find something of interest here".

The track "Mystic Brew" has been sampled in a number of hip-hop songs, most notably "Electric Relaxation" by A Tribe Called Quest. It has also been covered by musicians including the Vijay Iyer Trio, BadBadNotGood, and Mike Paradinas.

Track listing

Recorded at Rudy Van Gelder Studio, Englewood Cliffs, New Jersey on January 20 (tracks 2 & 5-7) and January 21 (tracks 1, 3, 4 & 8), 1972.

Personnel
Ronnie Foster - organ
Eugene Bianco - harp
George Devens - vibes, cabasa, shaker, cowbell
Gene Bertoncini - Jazz guitar
George Duvivier - double bass
Gordon Edwards - bass guitar
Jimmy Johnson - drums
Arthur Jenkins - congas
Wade Marcus - arranger

References

External links 
 Ronnie Foster-The Two Headed Freap at Discogs

1972 debut albums
Ronnie Foster albums
Albums recorded at Van Gelder Studio
Albums arranged by Wade Marcus
Albums produced by George Butler (record producer)
Blue Note Records albums
Jazz-funk albums